Cateechee is an unincorporated community and census-designated place (CDP) in Pickens County, South Carolina, United States. It was first listed as a CDP prior to the 2020 census. The population as of 2020 was 321.

The CDP is in southwestern Pickens County, on a hillside rising to the south above Twelvemile Creek, a west-flowing tributary of the Seneca River. The community is bordered to the southeast by the town of Norris. South Carolina Highway 137 (Norris Highway) forms the eastern edge of the CDP; the highway leads southeast into Norris and northwest  to the town of Six Mile.

Demographics

2020 census

Note: the US Census treats Hispanic/Latino as an ethnic category. This table excludes Latinos from the racial categories and assigns them to a separate category. Hispanics/Latinos can be of any race.

References 

Census-designated places in Pickens County, South Carolina
Census-designated places in South Carolina